Francisco Ferrera (29 January 1794 – 10 April 1851) was a president of Honduras. He was born in San Juan de Flores, Honduras.

Ferrera joined the guerrerista campaigns of General Francisco Morazán and participated brilliantly in the battles of The Trinidad and Gualcho. In addition, he saw action in the pacification of Olancho. In March 1832, Ferrera faced Vicente Domínguez in Yoro and later in Sonaguera and Trujillo, defeating him in both opportunities. Due to his bravery on the battlefield, he was promoted by General Morazán.

In October 1838, Ferrera rebelled against the federalist government of General Morazán and fought to make Honduras a free state. On 5 April 1839, he was defeated by General Morazán in the battle of the Spirit Santo in El Salvador. After that humiliating defeat, Ferrera took refuge in Nicaragua.

He was Provisional Chief of State of Honduras (1833–1834) and Constitutional President (1841–1844).

He was re-elected President in 1847, resigning that same year before taking office. Ferrera died in Chalatenango, El Salvador, on 10 April 1851.

References

1794 births
1851 deaths
Presidents of Honduras
19th-century Honduran people
Rafael Carrera
People from Francisco Morazán Department